Mattioli is an Italian surname. Notable people with the surname include:

Alessandro Mattioli (born 1998), Italian footballer
Carlo Mattioli (born 1954), Italian race walker
Denise Mattioli (born 1952), Brazilian volleyball player
Ercole Antonio Mattioli (1640–1694), Italian minister
Gaspare Mattioli (1806–1843), Italian painter
Gianni Francesco Mattioli (born 1940), Italian politician and university professor
Girolamo Mattioli, Italian painter and engraver
Italo Mattioli (born 1985), Italian professional football player
Ludovico Mattioli (1662-1747), Italian painter and engraver
Luisa Mattioli (born 1936), Italian actress
Marcus Mattioli (born 1960), Brazilian swimmer
Mario Mattioli (1945–2003), Italian volleyball player
Massimo Mattioli (born 1943), Italian cartoonist
Mattiolo Mattioli (died 1480), Italian author
Maurizio Mattioli (born 1950), Italian actor and comedian
Pietro Andrea Mattioli (1501–1577), Italian herbalist
Raffaele Mattioli (1775-after 1831), Italian painter
Rocky Mattioli (born 1953), Italian-Australian former boxing world champion